is a multi-purpose stadium in Kagoshima, Japan.  It is currently used mostly for football and rugby union matches.  

It was formerly known as Kagoshima Kamoike Stadium. Since April 2018 it has been called Shiranami Stadium for the naming rights.

It is the home stadium of Kagoshima United FC of the Japan Football League and Je Vrille Kagoshima of the women's soccer club.  The stadium was originally opened in 1972 and has an official capacity of 19,934  spectators.

References

External links
Stadium picture
Kagoshima Pref. Stadium facilities

Football venues in Japan
Rugby union stadiums in Japan
Multi-purpose stadiums in Japan
Sports venues in Kagoshima Prefecture
Kagoshima United FC
Buildings and structures in Kagoshima
Sports venues completed in 1972
1972 establishments in Japan